This article lists the confirmed squads for the 1998 Women's Hockey World Cup held in Utrecht, Netherlands from May 20 and May 31, 1998.

Pool A

Australia
Head Coach: Ric Charlesworth

Kate Starre
Julie Towers
Katrina Powell
Nikki Mott
Claire Mitchell-Taverner
Alison Peek
Karen Smith
Katie Allen
Lisa Powell
Juliet Haslam
Bianca Langham
Alyson Annan
Renita Garard
Rechelle Hawkes (c)
Clover Maitland (GK)
Justine Sowry (GK)

China
Head Coach: Wang Qingsen

Nie Yali (GK)
Chen Hong
Chen Zhaoxia
Cai Xuemei
Wu Jing
Liu Lijie
Fu Baorong
Huang Junxia
Cheng Hui (c)
Zhang Anjie
Li Congrong
Bai Jinli
Juan Li
Tang Chunling
Wang Jiuyan
Zhou Shujie (GK)

Germany
Head Coach: Berthi Rauth

Julia Zwehl (GK)
Louisa Walter (GK)
Denise Klecker
Tanja Dickenscheid
Nadine Ernsting-Krienke
Inga Möller
Natascha Keller
Melanie Cremer
Friederike Barth
Wibke Weisel
Cornelia Reiter
Britta Becker
Marion Rodewald
Philippa Suxdorf
Heike Lätzsch
Katrin Kauschke (c)

Scotland
Head Coach: Mike Gilbert

Sue Lawrie (GK)
Tracy Robb (GK)
Alison Denholm
Helen Walker
Fiona Pearson
Janet Jack
Susan Fraser
Carrie Corcoran
Sue MacDonald
Rhona Simpson
Alison Grant
Louise Burton
Pauline Robertson (c)
Diane Renilson
Valerie Neil
Susan Gilmour

South Africa
Head Coach: Boudewijn Castelijn

Nicky du Toit (GK)
Inke van Wyk (GK)
Sharon Cormack
Jacqui Geyser
Carina van Zyl
Marilyn Agliotti
El-may Brink
Megan Dobson
Michele MacNaughton
Hanneli Arnoldi
Karen Roberts (c)
Lindsey Carlisle
Susan Wessels
Kerry Bee
Pietie Coetzee
Alison Dare

United States
Head Coach: Pam Hixon

Michelle Vizzuso
Kate Barber
Kristy Gleason
Peggy Storrar (GK)
Jana Withrow (GK)
Christine Debow
Kris Fillat
Kelli James
Tracey Fuchs (c)
Antoinette Lucas
Katie Kauffman
Lori Mastropietro
Kristien Holmes
Pam Neiss
Jill Reeve
Carolyn Schwarz

Pool B

Argentina
Head Coach: Sergio Vigil

Laura Mulhall (GK)
Sofía MacKenzie
Magdalena Aicega
Alejandra Gulla
Anabel Gambero
Ayelén Stepnik
Gabriela Liz
Gabriela Pando
Vanina Oneto
Jorgelina Rimoldi
Karina Masotta (c)
Mariana González Oliva
Mariela Antoniska (GK)
Mercedes Margalot
Luciana Aymar
Cecilia Rognoni

England
Head Coach: Maggie Souyave

Hilary Rose (GK)
Carolyn Reid (GK)
Jackie Empson
Jane Smith
Karen Brown
Melanie Clewlow
Sarah Blanks
Kirsty Bowden (c)
Lisa Copeland
Jane Sixsmith
Lucilla Wright
Joanne Mould
Jennie Bimson
Kerry Moore
Fiona Greenham
Purdy Miller

India
The squad was announced on 14 April 1998.
Head Coach: Balbir Singh

Helen Innocent (GK)
Sandeep Kaur (c)
Renu Bala
Helen Soy
Sita Gussain
Sumrai Tete
Shashi Bala
Manjinder Kaur
Kamla Dalal
Pritam Rani
Nidhi Khullar
Tingonleima Chanu (GK)
Mary Tirkey
Suraj Lata Devi
Jyoti Sunita Kullu
Sanggai Chanu

South Korea
Head Coach: Kim Do-soon

Park Yong-sook (GK)
Kim Eun-jin
Lee Seon-hwa
Yoo Hee-joo
Kim Tae-seon
Kim Myung-ok
Kim Seong-eun
Choi Kwan-sook
Choi Mi-soon
Woo Hyun-jung
Kim Soo-jung
Cho Bo-ra
Oh Seung-shin (c)
Park Eun-kyung
Lee Eun-young
Choi Kyung-hee (GK)

New Zealand
Head Coach: Paul Ackerley

Skippy Hamahona
Moira Senior
Leisen Jobe
Sandy Bennett
Diana Weavers
Tina Bell-Kake
Anna Lawrence (c)
Robyn Mathews
Jenny Duck
Kate Trolove
Kylie Foy
Mandy Smith
Lisa Walton
Suzie Pearce
Helen Clarke (GK)
Karen Smith (GK)

Netherlands
Head Coach: Tom van 't Hek

Clarinda Sinnige (GK)
Daphne Touw (GK)
Inge Broek
Julie Deiters
Ellen Kuipers
Jeannette Lewin
Hanneke Smabers
Dillianne van den Boogaard
Margje Teeuwen
Mijntje Donners
Ageeth Boomgaardt
Fatima Moreira de Melo
Minke Smabers
Carole Thate (c)
Fleur van de Kieft
Suzan van der Wielen

References

squads
Women's Hockey World Cup squads